Association football was included in every three editions of International Workers' Summer Olympiads in 1925, 1931 and 1937 as a men's competition sport. Tournaments were played as a single-elimination tournament. Countries were represented by selected teams of their workers' sports associations and the players were mostly amateurs. Exception was the Soviet team in 1937 as it was based mostly on the team of masters of Spartak sports society out of Moscow and participating in the recently established in the Soviet Union competitions of football teams of sports societies, Class A, a predecessor of the Soviet Top League.

Frankfurt am Main 1925 
1925 Workers' Summer Olympiad was held in Frankfurt am Main, Germany. Participating teams in the football tournament were Belgium, Czechoslovakia, Finland, France, Germany and Switzerland.

Group stage

Semifinals

Final

Vienna 1931 
1931 Workers' Summer Olympiad was held in Vienna, Austria and 16 teams took part at the football tournament. Leading scorer was Erwin Seeler, the father of famous German striker Uwe Seeler. He scored seven goals on a quarterfinal match against Hungary as the German team beat the Hungarians 9–0.

First round

Quarterfinals

Semifinals

Final

Consolation tournament

Antwerp 1937 
1937 Workers' Summer Olympiad was held in Antwerp, Belgium. It was a joint event with the Spartakiads. Participating teams came from Belgium, Czechoslovakia, Denmark, England, Finland, France, Hungary, Netherlands, Norway, Palestine, Poland, Soviet Union, Spanish Republican faction and Switzerland. A delegation from Soviet Union was competing at the Olympiads for the first time. German athletes did not participate since labor sports organisations were disbanded in Germany by the Nazi regime in 1933. The Soviet Union was represented by Spartak Moscow.

Note: the results are not complete.

First round

Quarterfinals

Semifinals

Final

Consolation tournament

Sources 
RSSSF - Labour Olympiads

References 

International Workers' Olympiads
International Workers' Olympiads
International Worker's Olympiads